Gary McCabe (born 1 August 1988) is a retired Irish footballer who last played for Bray Wanderers as a winger.

Career
McCabe began his youth career at Leinster Senior League side Crumlin United. His impressive performances in the youth and intermediate ranks did not go unnoticed and attracted interest from a number of League of Ireland clubs. McCabe was eventually snapped up by Premier Division outfit Bray Wanderers for the 2007 season. McCabe broke straight into Bray's first team that season making 24 league and cup appearances and scoring 2 goals helping the Seagulls to league safety with a 9th place league finish. He scored his first Bray goal at the age of 18 during a 2–1 victory over UCD at the Carlisle Grounds on 29 May 2007.

The 2008 season started as a difficult season for McCabe. Despite Bray flying as high as 4th in Premier Division table, the left sided winger struggled for form and discipline getting sent off twice in just 9 league appearances. To regain first team football, Bray sent the young winger out on loan to First Division title chasing side Shelbourne for the remainder of the 2008 season. McCabe made his Shelbourne debut as a second-half substitute during a 2–0 defeat to Limerick 37 at Tolka Park on 11 July 2008. McCabe made 9 competitive appearances for Shelbourne during his loan spell and he impressed the Shelbourne faithful with his pace and skill.

During this time he represented Republic of Ireland national futsal team in the qualifying rounds of the 2010 UEFA Futsal Championship. He returned to Bray Wanderers following his loan spell at Shelbourne. McCabe had a revitalised season in 2009 as he finished Bray's top scorer contributing 8 goals in 38 league and cup appearances.

At the end of the season McCabe signed for Sligo Rovers in December 2009.

In 2010 McCabe played a vital part in Sligo Rovers' hugely successful season as they finished in 3rd place in the league and also won the League of Ireland Cup and the FAI Cup. However, McCabe's contract expired at the end of the 2010 season and he signed for The Hoops in January 2011.

He made his League debut for the Hoops in the opening night win over Dundalk.

He won the Setanta Cup in 2011 and played in the 2011–12 UEFA Europa League netting a memorable equaliser against Partizan Belgrade in August 2011 McCabe scored in the 2–1 away defeat against FK Ekranas on 25 July 2012 in the UEFA Champions League qualifying rounds. This goal was the 100th all time goal in this competition for League of Ireland clubs.

He signed a two-year contract in November 2012.

Personal life
His sister Katie is captain of the Republic of Ireland women's national football team.

Career statistics 
Professional appearances – correct as of 27 August 2019.

Honours
Sligo Rovers
FAI Cup (1): 2010
League of Ireland Cup (1): 2010

Shamrock Rovers
League of Ireland (1): 2011
Setanta Sports Cup (2): 2011, 2013

References

External links
Gary McCabe's profile at www.shelbournefc.com

Living people
1988 births
Association footballers from County Dublin
Republic of Ireland association footballers
Republic of Ireland men's futsal players
Republic of Ireland international futsal players
Association football midfielders
League of Ireland players
Bray Wanderers F.C. players
Shelbourne F.C. players
Sligo Rovers F.C. players
Shamrock Rovers F.C. players
Crumlin United F.C. players
Leinster Senior League (association football) players